Madderty railway station served the locality of Madderty in Perthshire, Scotland. The village of St. Davids is around one mile to the south.

History 
Opened on 21 May 1866 by the Crieff and Methven Junction Railway, then operated by the Caledonian Railway,  it became part of the London, Midland and Scottish Railway during the Grouping of 1923. Passing on to the Scottish Region of British Railways on nationalisation in 1948, the station was closed to passenger traffic by British Railways on 1 October 1951.

For several years following closure the Station Master's house was rented out as holiday accommodation in the Summer. It is now a private house.

References

Notes

Sources 
 
 
 
 Madderty railway station on navigable O. S. map

Disused railway stations in Perth and Kinross
Railway stations in Great Britain opened in 1866
Railway stations in Great Britain closed in 1951
1866 establishments in Scotland
Former Caledonian Railway stations